Dothan is a city in Dale, Henry, and Houston counties and the Houston county seat in the U.S. state of Alabama. It is Alabama's eighth-largest city, with a population of 71,072 at the 2020 census. It is named after the biblical city where Joseph's brothers threw him into a cistern and sold him into slavery in Egypt.

Dothan is the principal city of the Dothan, Alabama metropolitan area, which encompasses all of Geneva, Henry, and Houston counties; the small portion in Dale County is part of the Ozark Micropolitan Statistical Area. Together they form the Dothan-Ozark Combined Statistical Area. Coffee County and its Enterprise micropolitan area was originally combined as a statistical area with both Dothan and Ozark as well, but is now split off as its own statistical area by the US Census Bureau. Together they form the Wiregrass region, of which Dothan is the Alabama portion's largest city. The combined population of the entire Dothan metropolitan area in 2010 was 145,639. The city is the main transportation and commercial hub for a significant part of southeastern Alabama, southwest Georgia, and nearby portions of the Florida Panhandle. Since approximately one-fourth of the U.S. peanut crop is produced nearby, much of it processed in the city, Dothan is known as "The Peanut Capital of the World". It also hosts the annual National Peanut Festival at the Peanut Festival Fairgrounds.

History

Earliest years
Between 1763 and 1783, the region that is now Dothan was part of the colony of British West Florida.

The first permanent white settlers consisted of nine families who moved into the area during the early 1830s to harvest the abundant timber. Their settlement, named Poplar Head after the spring, failed to thrive. It was all but abandoned by the time of the Civil War. After the war, a local Pony Express route was founded; together with other developments during the Reconstruction Era, the town began to grow. On November 11, 1885, the citizens voted to incorporate, naming their new city Dothan at the suggestion of a local clergyman after discovering that "Poplar Head" was already registered with the U.S. post office for a town in northern Alabama.

Civil unrest
On October 12, 1889, Dothan was the scene of a deadly altercation resulting from a dispute over a tax levied on wagons operating within city limits. Local farmers opposed the levy and united in a body called the "Farmers Alliance". The arrest of some of the alliance's men led to a riot that left two men dead and others seriously wounded. Chief of Police Tobe Domingus was found guilty of murder and sentenced to ten years in prison. Appeals to the Alabama Supreme Court resulted in a new trial, and Domingus was acquitted.

Expansion and growth

Farmers turned to peanut production, which was successful and brought financial gain to the city. It became a hub for the production and transport of peanuts and peanut-related products. Today, one-quarter of the U.S. peanut crop is harvested within  of Dothan.

Geography
Dothan is in northwestern Houston County in southeastern Alabama. The city limits extend north into Henry County and northwest into Dale County.

Climate
Dothan has a humid subtropical climate (Köppen Cfa). Tornadoes are a frequent risk during the spring, summer and fall; the city's tornado activity is slightly below the Alabama state average, but 79% above the U.S. average.

Demographics

The state-recognized Cher-O-Creek Intra Tribal Indians were in Dothan. They descended from members of the Cherokee and Creek peoples who occupied this area and resisted removal to Indian Territory in the 1830s.

2020 census

As of the 2020 United States census, there were 71,072 people, 27,103 households, and 16,607 families residing in the city.

Government

Dothan is governed by a mayor and city council (called the "board of commissioners"), with a city manager employed to manage city affairs. The city is divided into six council districts, with one commissioner elected from each single-member district to a four-year term. Members of the commission serve part-time and are responsible for drafting all city ordinances and policies and appropriation of city funds. Dothan's mayor is elected at-large for four years and serves as a member of the board of commissioners. The city manager implements the board's policies and manages the city's day-to-day operations, including hiring, managing and firing the heads of city government departments. A total of 999 full-time and 215 part-time employees work for Dothan's city agencies, including police, fire, clerical, judicial, finance, public works and utilities.

As of 2017, the mayor was Mark Saliba and the city manager was Mike West. Larry H. Williams served as city fire chief and Steve Parrish was police chief.

Dothan is in Alabama's 2nd congressional district; its representative (as of 2021) is Barry Moore. The city is divided among three different state senate districts (28, 29 and 31) and four state representative districts (85, 86, 87 and 93).

Education
Most K-12 students in Dothan and Houston County attend Dothan City Schools or Houston County Schools. Others attend local private schools, such as Houston Academy, Providence Christian School, Northside Methodist Academy, Emmanuel Christian School, and Westgate Christian School. Institutes of higher education include Fortis College, Troy University Dothan Campus, Wallace Community College, Bethany Divinity College & Seminary, and the Alabama College of Osteopathic Medicine.

Infrastructure

Airport
Dothan Regional Airport is served by Delta Air Lines and Aero-One Aviation as of September 2017. The airport was established at the former Army airbase at Napier Field in 1965, after then-Mayor Richmond McClintock started a push to move the airport in the early 1950s. Jet services began in 1968 with Southern Airways' acquisition of DC-9 aircraft, and continue today using the CRJ-200 regional passenger jet.

Unlike many municipal airports in the U.S., the Dothan airport is entirely self-supporting, operating without tax-generated funding. All airport revenue is generated by rental and other user fees charged to patrons and tenants of the facility.

The airport serves as the local National Weather Service's weather observation station.

Ground transportation

Highway and bus
U.S. Routes 84, 231, and 431 run through Dothan along various parts of Ross Clark Circle (AL-210), the bypass encircling the city. U.S. 84 runs along the northern part of the bypass from west to east, leading east  to Bainbridge, Georgia and west  to Enterprise. U.S. 231 runs along the western part of the bypass from south to north, leading northwest  to Troy and south  to Panama City, Florida. U.S. 431 begins its path northward at the southern end of Ross Clark Circle, and runs along the eastern part of the bypass, leading north  to Eufaula. Other highways that run through Dothan include Alabama State Routes 52 and 53.

Passenger trains no longer operate through Dothan, but Greyhound Bus Lines maintains a station in town. Dothan does not have regularly scheduled public transportation, but offers dial-a-ride service through its nonprofit Wiregrass Transit Authority.

Religion
The largest Christian denomination in Dothan is the Southern Baptist church. There are also Anglican, Churches of Christ, Methodist, Presbyterian, Lutheran, AME, Freewill Baptist, Episcopal, United Pentecostal, Assemblies of God, Seventh-day Adventist and various Evangelical churches serving Dothan's Protestant community. 
Saint Michael's Orthodox Church is an Antiochian Orthodox Church, serving the orthodox community in Dothan and the Wiregrass.
St. Columba Catholic Church serves Dothan's Roman Catholics. Dothan hosts a Reform Judaism synagogue, Temple Emanu-El, which became nationally famous in 2008 when the congregation offered Jewish families as much as $50,000 to relocate to Dothan to build up the community. The city is also home to two mosques, two Wards of The Church of Jesus Christ of Latter-Day Saints, a Kingdom Hall of Jehovah's Witnesses.

Media
Dothan is served by a daily newspaper, the Dothan Eagle, a weekly newspaper, the Dothan Progress, and a blog, Rickey Stokes News. It has four television stations, WRGX-LD 23 (NBC), WDFX 34 (FOX), WDHN 18 (ABC) and the oldest television station in southeastern Alabama, WTVY 4 (CBS/MyNetworkTV/CW). WOW!, Comcast and Spectrum (formerly Time Warner Cable) provide cable television service. DirecTV and Dish Network provide direct broadcast satellite television, including local and national channels. The city is also served by several radio stations; among the oldest is 560 WOOF-AM, which went on the air as an AM station in 1947; 99.7 WOOF-FM went on the air in 1964. As of 2020, the radio formats in Dothan are top 40/CHR/pop (106.7 WKMX), adult contemporary (107.7 W299BX, 99.7 WOOF-FM), classical (88.7 WRWA), Christian (94.3 WIZB), rock (100.5 WJRL-FM), classic hits (102.5 WESP), country (95.5 WTVY-FM, 105.3 WECB), rap/hip hop/urban (700/105.9 WARB/W290DG), urban adult contemporary (93.1 WBBK-FM), talk radio (103.9 WDBT), and sports (560/101.1/107.1 WOOF-AM/W261AT/W296DQ). Dothan Magazine offers a bimonthly, people-focused viewpoint of the Dothan area keeping readers up to date on the latest community events, trends and issues. Archived issues of Dothan Magazine are online.

Sports
Dothan hosted minor league baseball teams from 1915 to 1917 (AL-FL-GA League and Dixie League) and from 1936 to 1962 (AL-FL League, GA-FL League and AL State League). Teams were known at varying times as the Boll Weevils, Browns, Rebels, Cardinals and Phillies. Major League affiliations were maintained in later years with the St. Louis Cardinals and the Philadelphia Phillies. All teams played at the "D" league level, a defunct minor-league classification that represented the entry or "rookie" level in the minors. Ballparks included Baker Field, City Park, Stadium Park, Jill Alexander Miracle Field and the Wiregrass Memorial Stadium.

The city served host to the Ultimate Fighting Championship on February 7, 1997, at the Dothan Civic Center Arena.

Dothan was selected as one of 11 Alabama sites for a course on the Robert Trent Jones Golf Trail.

In 2007–10, Dothan was recognized as part of the "Playful City USA" initiative by KaBOOM!, created to honor cities that ensure that their children have great places to play.

Economy
Dothan has a diverse economy. Agriculture is the largest industry, though retail sales and restaurants have experienced a rapid growth in recent years. Peanut production remains a mainstay of the agricultural sector, but cotton is gaining in importance. Tomato production is significant as well, especially in the nearby town of Slocomb, which styles itself "the Tomato Capital of the World".

Top employers
According to the city's 2011 Comprehensive Annual Financial Report, the top employers in the city are:

Crime and police violence
According to records available on a police violence tracking website, police have killed 20 people directly or indirectly between 2000 and 2020. Most of the victims were shot, tasered or asphyxiated. Particularly brutal was the killing of a man at a local animal shelter over his refusal to show proper identification to police. A federal judge cleared the police officer after body camera footage showed that the man had taken the officer's taser and attempted to use it on the officer during an altercation. In 2021, the city of Dothan settled a lawsuit with a payment of $250,000.

Culture

Museums and monuments
The George Washington Carver Museum relates the story of the African-American genius and offers information on African cultures and their influences on the world, prominent African-American scientists, explorers and inventors, and the positive contributions African Americans have made in military affairs and social development.

The Wiregrass Museum of Art, in the city's original power and water plant (1913), features ongoing exhibitions of visual and decorative art. Its permanent collection includes works by contemporary Southeastern artists such as Dale Kennington, Frank Flemming, Dale Lewis and Cal Breed, as well by nationally recognized artists including Frank Stella and Jim Dine. The museum was organized in 1989 by private citizens and the City of Dothan; it is operated by the Wiregrass Museum of Art, Inc., a 501(c)3 organization.

Art and theatre scene
Southeast Alabama Community Theater offers live entertainment and theatrical productions for the Dothan community.

Spark Theater Company is a nonprofit theater company and performing-arts educational program. Spark Theater offers several public theater productions each year by Dothan-area youth and teens, an after-school theater program, as well as supplemental theater classes for the public school system.

Notable public art
The Joseph statue at Millennium Park is a ten-foot cast bronze sculpture in the downtown area. It represents the Bible verse "For I heard them say, Let us go to Dothan" (Genesis 37:17), on which the town based its name.

Peanuts Around Town is a public art project organized by The Downtown Group, consisting of  peanut sculptures decorated in various fashions and displayed around Dothan.

"Wiregrass Festival of Murals" is an ongoing project offering historic murals painted by nationally and internationally acclaimed muralists on walls of buildings in the downtown historic district. Guided tours are available upon request.

Local music
The Dothan Opera House, built in 1915, features theatre performances, concerts, symphonies, ballet performances, and other cultural events. Tours are available upon request.

Music South, formerly the Southern Alabama Symphony Association, offers a wide variety of musical performances, from classical symphony performances to jazz, African and other musical styles. "Music by Moonlight" offers four free concerts per year at Dothan's Landmark Park, featuring classical, jazz, Celtic and bluegrass musicians, among others.

Patti Rutland Jazz is a professional contemporary jazz and hip-hop dance company in Dothan. The company produces two full-length jazz and hip-hop theatrical dance productions yearly (one in late February and one in early June) at its home in the Cultural Arts Center, as well as at Dothan's historical landmark Opera House. Patti Rutland Jazz operates as a nonprofit 501(c)(3) organization whose core mission is to offer its dancers to the Wiregrass Region to assist underserved youths with free dance classes. This mutually beneficial program hopes to make Dothan a destination for, and a source of, future professional dance talent in the United States.

Area attractions

 Highland Oaks Golf Course is part of Alabama's Robert Trent Jones Golf Trail.
 The "World's Smallest City Block" is behind the Dothan City Civic Center between North Appletree Street, North College Street, and East Troy Street.

Notable people

John Rainey Adkins (1941-1989), self-taught guitarist and songwriter 
Robert Edwin Russ, founder of Ruston, Louisiana, lived near Dothan in his early years
Haywood Sullivan (1930-2003), major league baseball catcher and owner
Jamie Thomas (born 1974), professional skateboarder
Dancin' Dave (1927 - 2015), local street performer.
Matt Cain, major league baseball pitcher.

References

External links

 
 Dothan Chamber of Commerce
 Historic photos 
 Landmark Park

 
Cities in Alabama
Cities in Dale County, Alabama
Cities in Henry County, Alabama
Cities in Houston County, Alabama
County seats in Alabama
Dothan metropolitan area, Alabama
Enterprise–Ozark micropolitan area
Logging communities in the United States
Populated places established in the 1830s